The 1977 US Open was a tennis tournament that took place on the outdoor clay courts at the West Side Tennis Club in Forest Hills, Queens, in New York City, United States. The tournament ran from 29 August until 11 September. It was the 97th staging of the US Open, and the fourth Grand Slam tennis event of 1977. This was the third and final year in which the US Open was played on clay courts. After 68 years it was the final time the championship was played at the West Side Tennis Club in Forest Hills before moving to Flushing Meadows for the 1978 tournament.

Seniors

Men's singles

 Guillermo Vilas defeated  Jimmy Connors 2–6, 6–3, 7–6(7-4), 6–0
It was Vilas's 2nd career Grand Slam title, and his 1st (and only) US Open title. He was the first Argentine tennis player to win the US Open.

Women's singles

 Chris Evert defeated  Wendy Turnbull 7–6, 6–2
It was Evert's 7th career Grand Slam title, and her 3rd (consecutive) US Open title.

Men's doubles

 Bob Hewitt /  Frew McMillan defeated  Brian Gottfried /  Raúl Ramírez 6–4, 6–0

Women's doubles

 Martina Navratilova /  Betty Stöve defeated  Renee Richards /  Betty-Ann Stuart 6–1, 7–6

Mixed doubles

 Betty Stöve /  Frew McMillan defeated  Billie Jean King /  Vitas Gerulaitis 6–2, 3–6, 6–3

Juniors

Boys' singles
 Van Winitsky defeated  Eliot Teltscher 6–4, 6–4

Girls' singles
 Claudia Casabianca defeated  Lea Antonoplis 6–3, 2–6, 6–2

References

External links
Official US Open website

 
 

 
US Open
US Open (tennis) by year
1977 in sports in New York City
1977 in American tennis
US Open
US Open